The Rally for France ( (RPF); also briefly known in 2003 as Rally for France and European Independence or ) was a political party in France of the right. It was founded in 1999 by the Gaullist and former Interior Minister Charles Pasqua, then allied with Philippe de Villiers (ex-UDF). The RPF aimed to fight against globalisation and European federalism. The party was opposed to further European integration.

The new party enjoyed early electoral success when it placed second in the 1999 European Parliament election in France, scoring 13 percent of the vote and winning 13 seats. This placed it behind the Socialist Party but ahead of the established centre-right parties, the Gaullist Rally for the Republic-DL list and the UDF. However Philippe de Villiers' departure in late 2000, in order to refound his Movement for France, severely damaged the party and Pasqua failed to run in the 2002 Presidential elections. The RPF has since suffered several setbacks in various elections and has failed to regain its 1999-2000 momentum, and has been eclipsed by the MPF as a party of the Eurosceptic right in France. The party won two seats in the 2002 National Assembly election, through an alliance with the UMP but lost all its MEPs in the 2004 European election. Charles Pasqua was elected Senator for the Hauts-de-Seine in the 2004 French Senate election. He sat in the UMP group.

The RPF remained an associate party of the main centre-right party, the UMP.

See also
Movement for France
Rally of the French People

Factions and associate parties of the Union for a Popular Movement
Right-wing parties in France
Political parties established in 1999
Eurosceptic parties in France
1999 establishments in France
Political parties disestablished in 2011